Nicholas Hynes (born 18 June 1996) is an Australian professional rugby league footballer who plays as a  for the Cronulla-Sutherland Sharks in the NRL.

Early life
Hynes was born in Gosford, New South Wales, Australia and is of Indigenous Australian Wiradjuri descent and Scottish descent.

Hynes grew up in Central Coast, New South Wales, and was educated at Brisbane Water Secondary College, Central Coast.

He played his junior rugby league for the Umina Beach Bunnies and Woy Woy Roosters, before signing with the Manly-Warringah Sea Eagles.

Playing career

Early career
Hynes was signed by the Manly-Warringah Sea Eagles NYC team in 2015, before spending the next two seasons (2017–18) with the Mackay Cutters, where he played 42 Queensland Cup matches. He was also taking part in a teacher aide job at a Mackay primary school at the time.

2019 - 2021: Melbourne Storm
In 2019, Hynes signed with the Melbourne Storm transferring to their feeder club Sunshine Coast Falcons to continue playing in the Queensland Cup.

On 11 August 2019, Hynes made his NRL debut for the Melbourne Storm against South Sydney. He made his debut in his hometown in front of family and friends at Central Coast Stadium. He had his Melbourne jersey (cap number 198) presented to him by his older brother Wade Hynes.

Following the cancellation of the 2020 Queensland Cup, Hynes played 11 NRL matches in a utility role, mostly from the interchange bench, signing a further one year contract extension in September 2020.

Hynes was named on the bench in the Storm's 26–20 NRL Grand Final win over the Penrith Panthers. On this day, he wrote his name in the history books as the first player in the NRL Era to be selected in a grand final but not play a single minute. Records therefore show he was not credited for appearing in the match. The last time a team used less than 17 players in a grand final was the 1994 NSWRL Grand Final, when the victorious Canberra Raiders chose not to use two of their four substitutes.

On 1 June 2021, it was announced Hynes would be leaving the Melbourne club at the end of the 2021 NRL season to link up with Cronulla-Sutherland, with a view to shift into the halves & rebuild the club around him.
After a solid start to the season for the Melbourne Storm, Hynes was named in the extended NSW Blues side for game 3 of the 2021 State of Origin series.

2022 - Cronulla-Sutherland Sharks
In round 1 of the 2022 NRL season, Hynes made his club debut for Cronulla-Sutherland in their 24-19 loss against Canberra.
In round 2, Hynes kicked the winning conversion for Cronulla after the full time siren to defeat Parramatta 18-16.
On 29 May, Hynes was selected as 18th man by New South Wales to play in game one of the 2022 State of Origin series.
In round 20, Hynes kicked a field goal in golden point extra-time to win the match 21-20 over South Sydney.
In round 23, Hynes starred for Cronulla scoring two tries in a 40-6 victory over Manly in the battle of the beaches game.
Hynes capped off his first season at the Sharks receiving the Dally M Medal and the Provan-Summons Medal on 28 September.

Honours
Club
 2020 NRL Grand Final Winners
 2021 Minor Premiership Winners

Individual
 2022 Dally M Medal Winner
 2022 Provan-Summons Medal Winner

Statistics

NRL
 Statistics are correct as of the end of the 2022 season

All Star

References

External links
Melbourne Storm profile

1996 births
Living people
Australian people of Scottish descent
Australian rugby league players
Indigenous Australian rugby league players
Melbourne Storm players
Cronulla-Sutherland Sharks players
Rugby league five-eighths
Rugby league players from Gosford, New South Wales
Wiradjuri people
Sunshine Coast Falcons players